Mydromera is a genus of moths in the subfamily Arctiinae erected by Arthur Gardiner Butler in 1876.

Species
 Mydromera carmina Schaus, 1938
 Mydromera notochloris (Boisduval, 1870)

References

Arctiinae